Héctor Ortiz Benítez (born 20 December 1928, date of death unknown) was a Mexican professional footballer who played as a midfielder.

Career
Ortiz had a role in the development of Club Universidad Nacional. He played for Mexico national team in the 1950 FIFA World Cup. He also played for Club Deportivo Marte. He scored Mexico's only goal in the 4–1 loss against Yugoslavia in the 1950 FIFA World Cup.

Ortiz is deceased.

References

External links
FIFA profile

1928 births
Year of death missing
Mexican footballers
Mexico international footballers
Association football midfielders
1950 FIFA World Cup players